Diplodactylus galeatus, sometimes called the helmeted gecko, is a gecko endemic to Australia.

References

galeatus
Reptiles described in 1963
Taxa named by Arnold G. Kluge
Geckos of Australia